Charlie Walk (born September 2, 1968) is an American music executive and entrepreneur. He was the president of Republic Records from 2016–2018, and the president of Epic Records from 2005–2008. In 2018, he appeared as a judge on the Fox reality series The Four: Battle for Stardom.

Early and personal life
Walk said he first wanted to work in the music industry when he was eight years old, when he listened to Boston's WRKO on his portable radio. Walk started out in 1987 as a college marketing representative for Sony Music Distributions New England branch while he was attending Boston University's School of Management (Questrom School Of Business). He graduated in 1990 with a Bachelor of Science degree in Business Administration.

Walk married Lauran Miller in 1997. The couple lives in Tribeca and Water Mill since 2003 and have four children.

Career

Columbia Records
Walk worked at Columbia Records in 1990 as a marketing and promotion manager covering the Northeast Region. His first job was to work with the New Kids on the Block over their first days on their local promotion, trying to break them into the mainstream. Since 1994, he is Director, since 1997 Vice President in Pop Promotion.

During his time at Columbia he became vice president for promotion at the label, and was profiled by The New York Times as one of the music industry's "young guns" in 1998. At Columbia he worked with Destiny's Child and Beyoncé Knowles, Will Smith, Maxwell, John Legend, Mariah Carey, The Fugees, Lauryn Hill, Wyclef Jean, John Mayer, Bruce Springsteen, and Aerosmith.

He was named executive vice president, promotion, in 2000 from the position of senior vice president of pop promotion. In 2004, he was promoted to executive vice president of creative marketing and promotion at Columbia where he was in charge of developing strategies in non-traditional marketing areas, along with licensing.

Epic Records
In December 2005, Walk became president of Epic Records. Jessica Simpson moved from Columbia to Epic to follow Walk. He also worked with the label’s established artists, including RedOne.

He also created a partnership with ABC to integrate Epic artists with their programming, which enabled viewers to purchase songs they heard on ABC television shows. Walk also broke new artists at Epic including The Script, Sean Kingston, The Fray, Sara Bareilles and Natasha Bedingfield. He was let go from the label in December 2008.

JWALK
In February 2009, Walk started his own entertainment company CWE Media to create content for Endemol, with a talent management and strategic branding divisions. Walk was executive producing the television content developed by the company. The company was functioning until 2011.

Later in 2009, Walk co-founded RJW Collective, later known as JWALK. The company's clients include the retailer Lacoste and the television broadcaster ABC.

Republic Records
In 2013 Walk joined Republic Records as its executive vice president. His position involves overseeing the marketing, PR and promotion teams for the label. On July 2, 2014, Walk produced a one-off revival episode of Total Request Live on MTV entitled "Total Ariana Live". He has also helped bring in John Varvatos Records.

In 2014, Walk led Enrique Iglesias' "Bailando" single campaign, which crossed the song over from Latin radio to Top 40 radio. The song has a blend of English and Spanish lyrics, and became the highest charting bilingual single since "The Macarena" in 1996. Walk spearheaded Taylor Swift’s "Shake It Off" campaign which led Swift to become the first artist to have a single debut at number one on the pop music radio charts. Additionally, Walk led the promotion for Lorde's quadruple platinum single "Royals". The Wall Street Journal wrote that Walk "is working on creating partnerships with radio stations, concert venues and music publications or blogs that will circulate her music without catapulting it into the mainstream. Instead of sending her music to KIIS, a famous top-40 Los Angeles radio station, they've turned to San Francisco's Live105 and Chicago's Q101, alternative stations." Walk also signed Hailee Steinfeld to Republic.

In February 2016, Walk was named president of the Republic Group, a newly formed grouping under the Universal Music Group, where he was charged with developing strategic partnerships with sister labels in addition to his role in charge of promotions and artist development. In 2016 Walk co-founded Guess Music, after approaching Paul Marciano to discuss his expanding their partnership into a full-fledged label. He also signed DNCE.

Allegations of sexual misconduct
Walk was accused of sexual misconduct on January 29, 2018, an allegation he denied. On January 31, he was placed on leave by Republic, pending an investigation, and on February 1, 2018, he withdrew from The Four: Battle for Stardom where he was one of the four residing judges. In a prepared statement, he said: "Out of respect for the contestants, my fellow judges and everyone involved with the show, I have made the decision not to attend the finale of The Four. I do not want my presence to be a distraction. Needless to say this is very upsetting."

Five women accused Walk of sexual misconduct over a period of decades in a lengthy piece published by Rolling Stone in February 2018. In March 2018, following an internal review, Universal and Walk agreed to "mutually part ways."  

In March 2021, Walk filed a lawsuit seeking $60 million in damages from  Mark Kasowitz, the attorney who negotiated his Universal exit deal. The suit stated  that  rather than defending Walk against "facially incredible claims," Kasowitz and his law firm "passively cooperated with UMG, leaving Mr. Walk defenseless."   The suit was dismissed in January 2022 by New York Supreme Court Justice Andrew Borrok,  who stated that Walk's complaint was an "outrageous attempt" to damage Kasowitz's reputation.

References

Living people
American music industry executives
Boston University School of Management alumni
American advertising executives
1968 births